Maud Barger-Wallach (June 15, 1870 – April 2, 1954) was an American tennis player of the early 1900s.

She was the daughter of Samuel F. Barger, a lawyer and director of the New York Central Railroad, and Edna Jenie LaFavor. In June 1890 she married sportsman Richard Wallach.

She only began playing tennis when she was about 30 years old. In 1908, Barger-Wallach became the oldest U.S. Open champion at the age of 38 (42-year-old Molla Mallory won in 1926, taking away her old-age record).

At the age of 61 in 1931, she traveled overseas with the U.S. men's tennis contingent, and when Sidney Wood of the U.S. won the Wimbledon Gentlemen's Singles over Frank Shields of the U.S. in the final, in a walkover because Shields was injured, Wood gave his trophy to Barger-Wallach to hold until the next time that he and Shields should play each other on grass (as at Wimbledon), telling her to give it to the winner. Wood finally met Shields in a tournament on grass at Queen's Club in London three years later, beating him, and Barger-Wallach then gave Wood's Wimbledon trophy to him.

She was a right-handed baseline player with an accurate but soft forehand and a weak backhand which, if possible, she tried to run around. She had an unorthodox playing style characterized by an underhand serve, accurate placements as well as tennis intelligence and determination.

Barger-Wallach was inducted in the International Tennis Hall of Fame in 1958.

Grand Slam finals

Singles: 3 (1 title, 2 runners-up)

Doubles: 1 runner-up

References

External links 
 
Sportspundit.com profile

1870 births
1954 deaths
American female tennis players
International Tennis Hall of Fame inductees
Sportspeople from New York City
Tennis people from New York (state)
United States National champions (tennis)
Grand Slam (tennis) champions in women's singles